Calosoma panderi is a species of ground beetle in the family Carabidae. It is found in Kazakhstan, Kyrgyzstan, and Russia.

Subspecies
These five subspecies belong to the species Calosoma panderi:
 Calosoma panderi akkolicum (Obydov & Gottwald, 2002)  (Kazakhstan and Kyrgyzstan)
 Calosoma panderi karelini (Fischer von Waldheim, 1830)  (Kazakhstan)
 Calosoma panderi panderi (Fischer von Waldheim, 1820)  (Kazakhstan and Russia)
 Calosoma panderi pavlovskii (Kryzhanovskij, 1955)  (Kazakhstan and Kyrgyzstan)
 Calosoma panderi rostislavi Semenov, 1906  (Kazakhstan)

References

Calosoma